Mark Steven Howe (born 28 May 1955) is an American former professional ice hockey defenseman and left winger who played sixteen seasons in the National Hockey League (NHL) following six seasons in the World Hockey Association (WHA). He is currently serving as the director of pro scouting for the Detroit Red Wings.

Howe is the son of Gordie and Colleen Howe, younger brother of Marty Howe, and nephew of Vic Howe. Despite the enormous shadow cast by his father and splitting time between two leagues, Howe shone as one of the best two-way NHL defensemen of the 1980s, being a three-time runner-up for the Norris Trophy and making the Stanley Cup finals three times as a player. He is a member of the United States Hockey Hall of Fame, and was inducted into the Hockey Hall of Fame in 2011. The Howe family received the Wayne Gretzky International Award in 2000, for major contributions to the growth and advancement of hockey in the United States.

Amateur career
As a youth, Howe played in the 1965 and 1966 Quebec International Pee-Wee Hockey Tournaments along with his brother Marty, on the Detroit Roostertail minor ice hockey team. Howe played junior hockey for the Detroit Jr. Red Wings. As a 15-year-old, he led his Red Wings to the US Junior Championship in 1971. In 1972, the United States earned a silver medal at the 1972 Olympics in Sapporo, Japan with 16-year-old Howe being the youngest hockey player to win an Olympic medal in ice hockey. Howe eventually ended his junior hockey career playing for the Toronto Marlboros of the OHL, winning a Memorial Cup MVP in the process.

Professional career
In 1973, Howe decided to play in the WHA alongside his brother, Marty and his father Gordie. Led by the Howes, the Houston Aeros won the 1974 and 1975 Avco Cups, awarded to the league champions of the WHA. Mark, playing left wing, was awarded the Lou Kaplan Trophy as Rookie of the Year and earned 2nd team All-Star status. Having dual citizenship, he represented his father's country in the 1974 Summit Series, where he was one of Team Canada's leading scorers.

Even though Howe had played a complete season in the WHA, the Boston Bruins proceeded to select him anyway with their second-round pick in the 1974 NHL amateur draft. He was the first active WHA player to be drafted by an NHL team, and the first of three selected in the 1974 draft, the other two being his brother Marty, selected by the Montreal Canadiens in the third round, and Tom Edur of the Cleveland Crusaders, who was also selected by Boston. All three players opted to remain with their WHA teams after the draft.

By the 1976–77 season, Howe was a full-time defenseman. Before the 1977–78 season, the Howes moved their family act to Hartford, Connecticut to play for the New England Whalers.

When the NHL and WHA merged in 1979, one of the four WHA teams left standing were the Whalers, who changed their name to the Hartford Whalers. In the 1979 NHL Expansion Draft, the Boston Bruins, who held his NHL rights, attempted to reclaim Mark Howe; however, the Whalers used a priority selection to retain him. Due to a gentlemen's agreement between the Whalers and the Red Wings, Detroit opted not to exercise their right to reclaim Gordie Howe; the Wings also opted not to reclaim Marty, whose rights they had previously acquired from Montreal. As a result, Mark, his father and his brother were able to play one more season together with the Whalers, this time in the NHL. The 1980–81 season proved to be one of Howe's best. Howe was a mid-season All-Star, and in the fall, he appeared for the US national team at the 1981 Canada Cup tournament.

Howe was involved in one of the more memorable injuries in NHL history. On December 27, 1980, he slid into the pointed metal center of the net and cut a five-inch gash in his rectal area. He was essentially impaled in an injury that nearly ended his career. Following a lawsuit by Howe, the NHL changed the design of its nets so that there would no longer be a center portion that jutted up toward the goal line. He lost 21 pounds and his stamina suffered after requiring liquid diet to avoid intestinal infections. After Whalers management lost faith in Howe, he requested a trade, and was moved in a four-player deal that also involved draft picks, to the Philadelphia Flyers.

The backbone of one of the NHL's best defensive teams of the mid-1980s, Howe was a finalist for the Norris Trophy three times, those being in 1982–83, 1985–86 and 1986–87 season. His Philadelphia team, backstopped by Vezina Trophy-winning goaltender Pelle Lindbergh, finished the 1984–85 season with most points and earned a berth in the Stanley Cup Finals, only to lose to the Edmonton Oilers' dynasty, which featured stars such as Wayne Gretzky, Paul Coffey and Mark Messier.

Howe had his best season during the 1985–86 season where he posted some of the best numbers ever by an NHL defenseman, in particular, leading the NHL with a remarkable +85 Plus/Minus rating and 7 shorthanded goals. He scored 24 goals, added 58 assists for 82 total points while being the lifeline out of the Flyers defensive zone with his outstanding skating and passing abilities. Unfortunately for Howe, Paul Coffey had perhaps one of the best seasons by a defenseman in NHL history, breaking Bobby Orr's single-season records for goals with 48, and tallying 138 points. Howe, for the second time, finished runner-up in Norris Trophy voting.

The 1986–87 season brought great success to both Howe and his Philadelphia Flyers teammates. The Flyers, for the third consecutive season, led the Prince of Wales Conference in points. Led by Howe and defense partner Brad McCrimmon, rookie netminder Ron Hextall, and a line featuring Brian Propp, Rick Tocchet and Pelle Eklund, the injury-riddled Flyers took the vaunted Edmonton Oilers to 7 games in the NHL Finals before succumbing 3–1 in the finale.

After the 1991–92 season, the Flyers granted Howe free agency and he signed with the Detroit Red Wings, the team with which his father had starred. Howe would have one more appearance in the Stanley Cup finals, but his Red Wings were swept in 1995 by the New Jersey Devils.

Post-playing career
Upon his retirement as a player following the 1994–95 season, Howe remained in the Detroit organization working in the hockey operations department first as a video coach and then as a pro scout, earning Stanley Cup rings when the Wings captured championships in 1997, 1998, 2002, and 2008. Upon his retirement, Howe was the last active Houston Aeros or New England Whalers player in the NHL, as well as the last active member of Canada's 1974 Summit Series team. He currently serves the club as its Director of Pro Scouting being based just outside Philadelphia in Jackson, NJ, from which he primarily covers NHL and AHL teams located in the eastern United States. Howe's older son, Travis, also works in the hockey development and coaching field as co-founder and head coach of the Selects Hockey player development program based in Bloomfield, Michigan.

Howe was elected to Philadelphia Flyers Hall of Fame in 2001 and the United States Hockey Hall of Fame in 2003. In June 2011, it was announced that Howe had been elected to the Hockey Hall of Fame to which he was inducted on November 14, 2011, in the players category.; he and his father Gordie were the second father-son combination in hockey history to be named to the Hall of Fame, behind Bobby and Brett Hull.

On March 6, 2012, the Philadelphia Flyers retired Mark Howe's #2 jersey in an on-ice ceremony at the Wells Fargo Center prior to a game with the Detroit Red Wings. Howe's number became only the fifth number to be retired by the Flyers in the club's then 44-season history following those of Bernie Parent (1), Bobby Clarke (16), Bill Barber (7) and the late Barry Ashbee (4). He was also the first to be so honored by the club since Barber's jersey was retired on October 11, 1990. With the retirement of Mark Howe's number 2 by the Flyers, Mark and Gordie Howe became only the second father-and-son combinations (Bobby and Brett Hull being the other) to have their numbers retired by NHL franchises. Howe also has won over 26 international awards.

Awards and achievements
 OJHL First All-Star Team (1971)
 Olympic silver medal in ice hockey (1972)
 Stafford Smythe Memorial Trophy (Memorial Cup Tournament MVP) (1973)
 WHA Second All-Star Team (1974)
 Lou Kaplan Trophy (Rookie of the Year – WHA) (1974)
 WHA Avco Cup Trophy (1974, 1975)
 WHA First All-Star Team (1979)
 NHL First All-Star Team (1983, 1986, 1987)
 NHL Plus/Minus Award (1986) (+85)
 Selected to five NHL All-Star Games: 1981, 1983, 1986, 1988 and 1994
 In 2010, he was inducted into the World Hockey Association Hall of Fame as a member of "The Howe Family" (including Gordie, Mark, Marty, and Colleen Howe).
 NHL career leader for shorthanded goals scored by a defenseman (tied for 26th overall among all players) with 28.

NHL Records
 Most career short-handed goals by a defenseman: (28)
 Highest Plus/Minus in a season by a U.S. born defenseman: (+87) in 1985–86
 Highest Plus/Minus career by a U.S. born defenseman: (+400)
 Highest Plus/Minus career in playoffs by a U.S. born defenseman: (+54)
 Most assists by a rookie U.S. born defenseman in a season: (56)
 Most points by a rookie U.S. born defenseman in a season: (80)
 Most short-handed goals in a season by a U.S. born defenseman: (7) in 1985–86

Career statistics

Regular season and playoffs

International

See also
 List of members of the United States Hockey Hall of Fame

References

External links

 
 Mark Howe's profile at HockeyDraftCentral.com
 Mark Howe's Detroit Red Wings Biography
 Mark Howe's profile at Flyersalumni.org.
 
 
 
 

1955 births
Living people
American men's ice hockey defensemen
American men's ice hockey left wingers
American sportspeople of Canadian descent
American people of English descent
Boston Bruins draft picks
Detroit Red Wings coaches
Detroit Red Wings players
Detroit Red Wings scouts
Hartford Whalers players
Hockey Hall of Fame inductees
Houston Aeros (WHA) players
Ice hockey coaches from Michigan
Ice hockey people from Detroit
Ice hockey people from Michigan
Ice hockey players at the 1972 Winter Olympics
Lester Patrick Trophy recipients
Medalists at the 1972 Winter Olympics
National Hockey League All-Stars
National Hockey League players with retired numbers
New England Whalers players
Olympic silver medalists for the United States in ice hockey
Philadelphia Flyers players
Sportspeople from Detroit
Stanley Cup champions
Toronto Marlboros players
United States Hockey Hall of Fame inductees